Acanthurus nigrofuscus, also known as the lavender tang, brown tang, or spot-cheeked surgeonfish, is a tang from the Indo-Pacific and Hawaii. It commonly makes its way into the aquarium trade. It grows to 21 cm in length. Recently, a huge bacterium discovered in its intestine, Epulopiscium fishelsoni, has been found to grow as large as 600 by 80 μm, a little smaller than a printed hyphen, which controls the pH of its host's gut, thereby influencing its host's ability to digest food and absorb nutrients.

Diet
The lavender tang is an herbivore that grazes primarily on benthic algae. In captivity, they will also feed on animal matter such as brine shrimp and mysis shrimp.

References

External links
 

Acanthuridae
Acanthurus
Fish of Asia
Fish of Palau
Fish described in 1775
Taxa named by Peter Forsskål